TIROS-N satellite is the first of the TIROS-N series. It is a weather satellite launched on 13 October 1978. It was designed to become operational during 2 years. Its mass is 734 kilograms. Its perigee to Earth is 829 kilometers. Its apogee is 845 kilometers away from Earth. Its inclination is 98.70°. It was managed by the U.S. National Oceanic and Atmospheric Administration (NOAA); designed and launched by NASA. The spacecraft was 3-axis stabilized. TIROS-N was operated for 868 days until deactivated by NOAA on 27 February 1981.

Gallery of cyclones captured by this satellite

References

External links 
 ITOS/TIROS-N/ATN (NOAA) series

Weather satellites of the United States
Spacecraft launched in 1978